is a Japanese animator known for creating the Kite film series.

Works

Filmography
Megazone 23 Part II (1986) character designer/animation director
Robot Carnival (1987) episode director/animation director, 'Presence' segment
 Lily C.A.T. (1987) character designer
 Casshan: Robot Hunter (1993) character designer
 Gatchaman (OVA) (1994) character designer
Cool Devices Operation 07: Yellow Star (1995) character designer
Lupin III: Dead or Alive (1996) animator
New Hurricane Polymar (1997) character designer
Hen (1997) character designer (as Yasuomi Umezu aka Strange Love)
Kimera (1997) character designer
Kite (1998) director/writer/character designer/animation director
Sol Bianca: The Legacy (1999) key animator
Mezzo Forte (2001) director/writer/character designer/animation director
 Nakoruru ~Ano hito kara no okurimono~ (OVA) (2002) character designer
Mezzo DSA (2004) (TV series) director/character designer/animation director
Kite Liberator (2008) director/writer/character designer/animation director
Dante's Inferno: An Animated Epic (2010) episode director
Beelzebub (2011) animation director (ED2)
Galilei Donna (2013) director
Wizard Barristers (2014) director/character designer
Gourmet Girl Graffiti (2015) animation director (OP)
Isuca (2015) animation director (ED)
Seraph of the End (2015) animation director (OP)
Gunslinger Stratos: THE ANIMATION (2015) animation director (ED)
Gangsta. (2015) animation director (ED)
Dimension W (2016) animation director (OP)
Bungo Stray Dogs (2016) animation director (ED)
Twin Star Exorcists (2016) animation director (OP1)
Touken Ranbu: Hanamaru (2016) animation director (OP)
ēlDLIVE (2017) animation director (ED)
Kokkoku: Moment by Moment (2018) character designer

Video games
Contra: The Hard Corps (Mega Drive, 1994) – Packaging and promotional illustrations (Japanese version)
Castlevania (Nintendo 64, 1999) – Promotional illustrations
Shin Megami Tensei: Nine (Xbox, 2002) – Character designer
Xenoblade Chronicles 2 (Nintendo Switch, 2017) – Illustrator

Manga
 Vegetables (1998)

References

External links
 Official blog 
 
 
 Yasuomi Umetsu anime at Media Arts Database 

1960 births
Japanese film directors
Anime character designers
Hentai creators
Anime directors
Living people
People from Fukushima Prefecture